The women's 4×100 metre freestyle relay event at the 1972 Olympic Games took place August 30. The relay featured teams of four swimmers each swimming two lengths of the 50 m pool freestyle.

Medalists

Results

Heats

Heat 1

Heat 2

Final

References

Swimming at the 1972 Summer Olympics
1972 in women's swimming
Women's events at the 1972 Summer Olympics